This is the list of episodes for Late Night with Jimmy Fallon in 2013 and 2014.

2013

January

February

March

April

May

June

July

August

September

October

November

December

2014

January

February

External links
   
 Lineups at Interbridge 

Late Night with Jimmy Fallon 2013-2014
Late Night with Jimmy Fallon 2013-2014
Episodes (2013-2014)